An anticyclone is a weather phenomenon defined as a large-scale circulation of winds around a central region of high atmospheric pressure, clockwise in the Northern Hemisphere and counterclockwise in the Southern Hemisphere as viewed from above (opposite to a cyclone). Effects of surface-based anticyclones include clearing skies as well as cooler, drier air.  Fog can also form overnight within a region of higher pressure. 

Mid-tropospheric systems, such as the subtropical ridge, deflect tropical cyclones around their periphery and cause a temperature inversion inhibiting free convection near their center, building up surface-based haze under their base.  Anticyclones aloft can form within warm-core lows such as tropical cyclones, due to descending cool air from the backside of upper troughs such as polar highs, or from large-scale sinking such as a subtropical ridge.
The evolution of an anticyclone depends upon variables such as its size, intensity, and extent of moist convection, as well as the Coriolis force.

History
Sir Francis Galton first discovered anticyclones in the 1860s. High-pressure systems are alternatively referred to as anticyclones. Their circulation is sometimes referred to as cum sole.  Subtropical high-pressure zones form under the descending portion of the Hadley cell circulation.  Upper-level high-pressure areas lie over tropical cyclones due to their warm core nature.

Surface anticyclones form due to downward motion through the troposphere, the atmospheric layer where weather occurs. Preferred areas within a synoptic flow pattern in higher levels of the troposphere are beneath the western side of troughs. On weather maps, these areas show converging winds (isotachs), also known as confluence, or converging height lines near or above the level of non-divergence, which is near the 500 hPa pressure surface about midway up the troposphere. Because they weaken with height, these high-pressure systems are cold.

Subtropical ridge

Heating of the earth near the equator forces upward motion and convection along the monsoon trough or intertropical convergence zone.  The divergence over the near-equatorial trough leads to air rising and moving away from the equator and to the poles aloft.  As air moves towards the mid-latitudes, it cools and sinks leading to subsidence near the 30° parallel of both hemispheres.  This circulation known as the Hadley cell forms the subtropical ridge.  Many of the world's deserts are caused by these climatological high-pressure areas.  Because these anticyclones strengthen with height, they are known as warm core ridges.

Formation aloft
The development of anticyclones aloft occurs in warm core cyclones such as tropical cyclones when latent heat caused by the formation of clouds is released aloft increasing the air temperature; the resultant thickness of the atmospheric layer increases high pressure aloft which evacuates their outflow.

Structure
In the absence of rotation, the wind tends to blow from areas of high pressure to areas of low pressure.  The stronger the pressure difference (pressure gradient) between a high-pressure system and a low-pressure system, the stronger the wind. The coriolis force caused by Earth's rotation gives winds within high-pressure systems their clockwise circulation in the northern hemisphere (as the wind moves outward and is deflected right from the center of high pressure) and anticlockwise circulation in the southern hemisphere (as the wind moves outward and is deflected left from the center of high pressure).  Friction with land slows down the wind flowing out of high-pressure systems and causes wind to flow more outward (more ageostrophically) from the center.

Effects

Surface-based systems

High-pressure systems are frequently associated with light winds at the surface and subsidence of air from higher portions of the troposphere.  Subsidence will generally warm an air mass by adiabatic (compressional) heating.  Thus, high pressure typically brings clear skies.  Because no clouds are present to reflect sunlight during the day, there is more incoming solar radiation and heating so temperatures rise rapidly near the surface.  At night, the absence of clouds means that outgoing longwave radiation (i.e. heat energy from the surface) is not blocked, allowing the escape of heat and giving cooler diurnal low temperatures in all seasons.  When surface winds become light, the subsidence produced directly under a high-pressure system can lead to a buildup of particulates in urban areas under the high pressure, leading to widespread haze.  If the surface level relative humidity rises towards 100 percent overnight, fog can form.

The movement of continental arctic air masses to lower latitudes produces strong but vertically shallow high-pressure systems.these systems affect their pressure.  The surface level, sharp temperature inversion can lead to areas of persistent stratocumulus or stratus cloud, colloquially known as anticyclonic gloom. The type of weather brought about by an anticyclone depends on its origin. For example, extensions of the Azores high pressure may bring about anticyclonic gloom during the winter because they pick up moisture as they move over the warmer oceans. High pressures that build to the north and move southwards often bring clear weather because they are cooled at the base (as opposed to warmed) which helps prevent clouds from forming.

Once arctic air moves over an unfrozen ocean, the air mass modifies greatly over the warmer water and takes on the character of a maritime air mass, which reduces the strength of the high-pressure system.  When extremely cold air moves over relatively warm oceans, polar lows can develop.  However, warm and moist (or maritime tropical) air masses which move poleward from tropical sources are slower to modify than arctic air masses.

Mid-tropospheric systems

The circulation around mid-level (altitude) ridges, and the air subsidence at their center, act to steer tropical cyclones around and out their periphery.  Due to the subsidence within this type of system, a cap can develop which inhibits free convection and hence mixing of the lower with the middle level troposphere.  This limits thunderstorms and other low-pressure weather activity near their centers and traps low-level pollutants such as ozone as haze under their base, which is a significant problem in large urban centers during summer months such as Los Angeles, California and Mexico City.

Upper tropospheric systems
The existence of upper-level (altitude) high pressure allows upper level divergence which leads to surface convergence. If a capping mid-level ridge does not exist, this leads to free convection and the development of showers and thunderstorms if the lower atmosphere is humid.  Because a positive feedback loop develops between the convective tropical cyclone and the upper level high, the two system are strengthened. This loop stops once ocean temperatures cool to below , reducing the thunderstorm activity, which then weakens the upper-level high-pressure system.

Importance to global monsoon regimes

When the subtropical ridge in the Northwest Pacific is stronger than in other areas, it leads to a wet monsoon season for Asia.  The subtropical ridge position is linked to how far northward monsoon moisture and thunderstorms extend into the United States.  Typically, the subtropical ridge across North America migrates far enough northward to begin monsoon conditions across the Desert Southwest from July to September.  When the subtropical ridge is farther north than normal towards the Four Corners, thunderstorms of the New Mexican Monsoon can spread northward into Arizona and New Mexico.  When suppressed to the south, the atmosphere dries out across the Desert Southwest, causing a break in the monsoon regime.

Depiction on weather maps

On weather maps, high-pressure centers are associated with the letter H in English, within the isobar with the highest pressure value. On constant-pressure upper-level charts, anticyclones are located within the highest height line contour.

Extraterrestrial versions
On Jupiter, there are two examples of an extraterrestrial anticyclonic storm; the Great Red Spot and the recently formed Oval BA on Jupiter. They are powered by smaller storms merging unlike any typical anticyclonic storm that happens on Earth where water powers them.  Another theory is that warmer gases rise in a column of cold air, creating a vortex as is the case of other storms that include Anne's Spot on Saturn and the Great Dark Spot on Neptune. Anticyclones had also been detected near the poles of Venus.

See also

Anticyclonic storm
Anticyclonic tornado
Atmosphere of Earth
Atmospheric circulation
Atmospheric pressure
Great Smog of London
Barometric ridge
Block (meteorology)
North American High
Ocean gyre
Pressure system

References

External links
Intertropical Convergence Zone photo - NASA Goddard Space Flight Center

 
Meteorological phenomena
Tropical cyclone meteorology